The Roman Catholic Diocese of Caruaru is a diocese located in the city of Caruaru in the Ecclesiastical province of Olinda e Recife in Brazil.

History
 August 7, 1948: Established as Diocese of Caruaru from the Metropolitan Archdiocese of Olinda e Recife

Leadership
 Bishops of Caruaru (Roman rite), in reverse chronological order
 Bishop José Ruy Gonçalves Lopes, O.F.M. Cap. (2019.07.10 - present)
 Bishop Bernardino Marchió (2002.11.06 – 2019.07.10)
 Bishop Antônio Soares Costa (1993.10.27 – 2002.06.07)
 Bishop Augusto Carvalho (1959.08.08 – 1993.10.27)
 Bishop Paulo Hipólito de Souza Libório (1949.03.15 – 1959.06.20)

References
 GCatholic.org
 Catholic Hierarchy
  Diocese website (Portuguese) 

Roman Catholic dioceses in Brazil
Christian organizations established in 1956
Caruaru, Roman Catholic Diocese of
Roman Catholic dioceses and prelatures established in the 20th century